Counterattack the Right-Deviationist Reversal-of-Verdicts Trend, later known as Criticize Deng, Counterattack the Right-Deviationist Reversal-of-Verdicts Trend, was a Chinese political campaign launched by Mao Zedong in November 1975 against Deng Xiaoping's anti-Cultural Revolution program. It was one of the last movements during the Cultural Revolution, and continued briefly under Hua Guofeng after Mao's 1976 death, before it officially ended with Deng's rise to power in July 1977.

The movement was openly repudiated during the 3rd Plenary Session of the 11th Central Committee of the Chinese Communist Party in December 1978.

References

Campaigns of the Chinese Communist Party
Cold War history of China
Cultural Revolution
Maoist China
Deng Xiaoping